The Ghizer District, formed in 1974, is the westernmost part of the Gilgit-Baltistan region of Pakistan. Currently, it is proposed to split Ghizer District into two (2) districts:

 The western part of Ghizer District  includes the actual Ghizer/ Gherz Valley of Phander, Gupis and Yasin. The name as Ghizer District will be kept with this region due to the connectivity to its origin.
 While the eastern part of the current District will include Puniyal and Ishkoman. And probably the newly district would be given the name as Puniyal-Ishkoman District.

The current district has Gahkuch as its capital. Ghizer was a crossroads between Gilgit and Chitral via Shandur Pass, and also to China and Tajikistan via the Broghil Pass through Ishkomen Valley. Ghizer was a multi-ethnic district and three major languages were spoken: Shina, Khowar, and Burushaski. There were also Wakhi speakers in Ishkoman and some Tajiks.

The word Ghizer came from the name "Gherz" which means "refugees" in Khowar. "Gherz" is a village in Golaghmuli Valley, which is now known as Golaghmuli. The Chitral in the Suzerainty of the British Raj forced some people to migrate towards Gupis, Yasin, Phander  Ishkomen and also to Punial. They were settled in the area between Chitral and Gupis and the area called Gherz and the people were called Gherzic. When Zulfiqar Ali Bhutto the President of Pakistan abolished the Frontier Crimes Regulations (FCR) system and gave another administrative district comprising the Tehsils (Political districts) the name Ghizer was given and agreed on unanimously. The then Resident and Commissioner for Gilgit and Baltistan, Ijlal Husain [ An Officer of the now defunct Civil Service of Pakistan - CSP]  played an important role in creating this administrative division in 1974–75.

Ghizer District comprised Punial, Gupis, Yasen, Phander and Ishkoman Valleys. The major portion of its area was ruled over by Brooshay Rajas known as Raja Sha Burush, Khan Bahadur Issa Bahadur  Akber Khan, Raja Anwar Khan, Raja Mirbaz Khan and last Broosh families Raja Jan Alam and Raja Muzafer (who was living in Golodass, also known as Anwerabad as its second name). In 1885 new rulers from Altit arrived to rule the vast territories of Ghizer valley they were from the Aqa Shah Dynasty. 6 generation of rulers from this family have been rulling the state the and in context it helped to spread the Ismaili Faith into the vast territories of Ghizer District. In 1900's the territories of Ishkoman, Punial, Kuh, Yasin and Ghizer came under their rule until 1974 when FCR system was amended. Currently, the living Raja families in the District are living in Ayshi Bala but they have no administrative function but act as a leading role in the development of society. Their linkage goes back to Sha Burush. Sha Burush, Sha Katur, and Sha Khushwaqt are three brothers except the Aqa Shah's, they are from other linkage, mainly From Hunzukutz.

Historically two main characteristics of the folk dress of Ghizer is the Khoi and the Shokah. The khoi is headgear made of homespun woolen cloths, while the shokah is a homespun woolen cloak reaching to the ankle with long sleeves. The region typically known for its lakes and landscapes.

History

Historically, the region was ruled by ethnic Kho Rajas (Katoor, Brushay, Shins) indigenous to the region. They all led tribes that were considered brothers, however, some Balti Mehtars had also governed for a period in Mehraja's period. The Yashkuns also ruled for the long period which first led by Mehrban Shah up to 7th sterns. The longest period of rule was by Katur Dynasty; later it was divided between the Mehtar of Chitral and the Maharaja of Kashmir. After 1895 all of Ghizer was annexed to Gilgit Agency, which was directly ruled by the British government, not the Kashmiri people. The whole region was under Frontier Crimes Regulations (FCR) from 1947 to 1972.

Tehsil Gupis is the central part of Ghizer district. There are many villages and lush green places, such as Shandur, Phander Lake, and Khalti Lake. The largest lake, Khalti, is famous for its trout. There are PTDC hotels available and also some private hotels in Ghahkuch.

Geography
Ghizer district was the northernmost part of the Northern Areas and hence the extreme north of the country. It borders the Wakhan strip of Afghanistan on its north-west, and China on its northern borders. On its west was the Chitral District of Khyber Pakhtunkhwa; and on its east the Gilgit District. Diamer District is on its south, which is again a part of the northern areas. Gakuch was the capital of Ghizer District.

Gupis has been serving as a junction between Yasin and Phander valley. It is the central place from all valleys like Phandar, Yasin, Poniyal, etc. The valley is located between the world's greatest mountain ranges, namely the Hindu Kush and Karakarum.

The highest peak Ghizer District is Koyo Zom (6,871 m) (Hindu Kush Range), which lies on the boundary between Ghizer District and Chitral.

Some of the main places in the district are Koh-i-Ghizer, Golaghmuli Valley, Ishkoman and Yasin valleys. Other places include Gupis, Chatorkhand, Imit, Pingal, 
Shahmaran and Utz.

Passes

Some of the passes in the district are: 
Shandur Pass (Punji-Lusht Plain between the boundary of Ghizer and Chitral District)
 Qurumbar Pass, Chillingi Pass
Chumarkhan Pass (Barsat in Ghizer to Chapali village in Chitral)
Hayal Pass and Naltar Pass (on the boundary of Ghizer and Gilgit Districts)
Bichhar Pass (on the boundary of Ghizer and Gilgit Districts)
 Thoi Pass (on the boundary of Ghizer and Chitral Yarkhon)
 Darkot Pass (on the boundary of Ghizer and Chitral).

Rivers

The main river in the district is the Ghizer River, which is formed from the Gupis and Ishkoman Rivers; both meet at Hatoon valley with Hayim as the point of confluence. The other tributaries include the Qurumbar River, Phakora River, Hayal River, Singul River and Yasin River, Phander river tributary which also joins the mainstream at different points. The biggest nala in the region is singal nala in the terms of area, which connects the punial valley to the Diamer district.

Lakes

 Handarap Lake
 Phander Lake
 Khalti Lake
 Karambar Lake
 Baha Lake (Langar Khukush)
 Shandur Lake
 Attar Lake
 Mathantar Lake
 Utter lake / @Attar lake

Tehsils

 Puniyal
 Ishkoman
 Yasin
 Gupis
 Phander
Sherqilla is the largest village of the district.

Colleges and schools
Karakorum International University sub campus Ghizer
Government Model High School Gahkuch.
Aga khan Diamond Jubblie Model Higher Secondary School Singal, Punial.
 Government Boys High school Gupis 
 Professional Science & Arts Academic school Gupis
 Government High School Golaghmuli Phander
 Government high school Gullapur. 
 Aga Khan Higher Secondary School Gahkuch, Ghizer
 Elysian Higher Secondary School Gahkuch Ghizer.
Iqra huffaz secondary school Gahkuch
 Aga Khan Schools 
 Aga Khan Higher Secondary School Sherqilla, Ghizer
 Hatun Degree College
 LRS Thingai Ghizer
 MIED College Phander
 World Roof Public School And College Hundur Yasin
 Inter College Gupis
 FG Boys High School Phander
 Govt Degree College Tause Yasin
 LRS Phander Ghizer
 Ghizer Public School Gahkuch
 Diamond Jubilee High School Gupis, Ghizer
 Lalik Jan Shaheed (NH) Army Public School and College Hundur Yasin
Iqra huffaz secondary school Yasu
 Diamond Jubilee Learning Resource High School Sandi Yasin
 Begal Academy Thoi Yasin
 Diamond Jubilee High School Thoi Yasin

Education 

According to the Alif Ailaan Pakistan District Education Rankings 2015, Ghizer was ranked 10 out of 148 districts in terms of education. For facilities and infrastructure, the district was ranked 17 out of 148.The biggest contribution in the region in education is "Aga Khan Education Service Pakistan"(AKESP).

See also

Districts of Gilgit-Baltistan
Shandur Polo Festival
Khukush Nala
Langer
Gupis

References

External links

 Rehmat Alam Puniyali, Map of Ghizer, flicker upload.

 
Districts of Gilgit-Baltistan
Ismailism in Pakistan
States and territories disestablished in 2019
1974 establishments in Pakistan
2019 disestablishments in Pakistan